Devaynes v Noble (1816) 35 ER 781, best known for the claim contained in Clayton's case, created a rule, or more precisely common law presumption, in relation to the distribution of money from a bank account. The rule is based upon the deceptively simple notion of first-in, first-out to determine the effect of payments from an account, and normally applies in English Law in the absence of evidence of any other intention.  Payments are presumed to be appropriated to debts in the order in which the debts are incurred.

Facts
Mr. Clayton had an account with a banking firm, Devaynes, Dawes, Noble, and Co, that was a partnership rather than a joint stock company as modern banks almost always are.  The bank's partners were therefore personally liable for the debts of the bank. One of the partners, William Devaynes, died in 1809. The amount then due to Clayton was £1,717. After Mr. Devaynes' death, Clayton made further deposits with the bank and the surviving partners paid out to Mr. Clayton more than the £1,717 on deposit at the time of Mr. Devaynes' death. The firm went bankrupt in 1810.

Judgment
Sir William Grant, Master of the Rolls, held that the estate of the deceased partner was not liable to Clayton, as the payments made by the surviving partners to Clayton must be regarded as completely discharging the liability of the firm to Clayton at the time of the particular partner's death.

Significance
The ruling was based on the legal fiction that, if an account is in credit, the first sum paid in will also be the first to be drawn out and, if the account is overdrawn, the first sum paid in is allocated to the earliest debit on the account which caused the account to be overdrawn. It is generally applicable in cases of running accounts between two parties, e.g., a banker and a customer, moneys being paid in and withdrawn from time to time from the account, without any specific indication as to which payment out was in respect of which payment in. In such case, when final accounts, which may run over several years, are made up, debits and credits will be set off against one another in order of their dates, leaving only a final balance to be recovered from the debtor by the creditor.

The rule is only a presumption, and can be displaced. The rule is one of convenience and may be displaced by circumstances or by agreement. In Commerzbank Aktiengesellschaft v IMB Morgan plc and others [2004] EWHC 2771 (Ch), the court elected to not apply the rule on the fact of the case (sums held in bank accounts derived from victims of Nigerian advance fee frauds).

Notwithstanding the criticisms sometimes levelled against it, and despite its antiquity, the rule is commonly applied in relation to tracing claims where a fraudster has commingled unlawfully obtained funds from various sources.

Exception to the rule
The rule does not apply to payments made by a fiduciary out of an account which contains a mixture of trust funds and the fiduciary's personal money.  In such a case, if the trustee misappropriates any moneys belonging to the trust, the first amount so withdrawn by him will not be allocated to the discharge of his funds held on trust but towards the discharge of his own personal deposits, even if such deposits were in fact made later in order of time.  In such cases, the fiduciary is presumed to spend their own money first before misappropriating money from the trust; see Re Hallett's Estate (1879) 13 Ch D 696.  The rule is founded on the principles of equity.  If a fiduciary has mixed his or her own money with sums of trust money in a private account, withdrawals are attributed to his or her own money as far as possible, Re MacDonald [1975] Qd R 255.  However, if the funds of two beneficiaries, or of a beneficiary and an innocent volunteer, are mixed the rule determines their respective entitlements, Re Diplock.

Applications to a partnership
The rule has special application in relation to partnerships upon the death of a partner.  In most jurisdictions, the death of a partner ordinarily has the legal effect of dissolution.  The partners' personal representatives have no right to step into the partner's shoes; they cannot take part in its management; they can only claim the deceased partner's share in the assets of the firm.  The banker, who provides financial accommodation to the firm, can have no objection in continuing the account; the bank can presume that the surviving partners will account to the representatives of the deceased for his share in the assets.  Where the firm has a debit balance, the account should be stopped to fix the liability of the estate of the deceased partner and to avoid the operation of the rule in Clayton's case.

See also
English trusts law
Tracing in English law
UK company law

References

 Encyclopaedic Australian Legal Dictionary

Bank regulation
Clayton's Case
English trusts case law
1816 in British law
1816 in case law
Court of Chancery cases